Breakthru may refer to:
 Breakthru (board game), a board game in the 1960s 3M Bookshelf Game Series
 BreakThru!, a 1994 video game
 "Breakthru" (song), a 1989 song by Queen
 "Breakthru" (song), a 2007 House Music song by Eskalation with Sacha Williamson
 Breakthru (Ran Blake album), a 1976 album by the jazz pianist Ran Blake
 [[Breakthru' (Nidji album)|Breakthru''' (Nidji album)]], a 2006 album by the Indonesian pop rock band Nidji
 Breakthru (Costa album), an album by the singer-songwriter Antoniette Costa
 "Break Thru", a song by Natasha Bedingfield from her 2010 album Strip Me''

See also
 Breakthrough (disambiguation) (includes "Break through")